Ottessa Charlotte Moshfegh (born May 20, 1981) is an American author and novelist. Her debut novel, Eileen (2015), won the Hemingway Foundation/PEN Award, was shortlisted for the Booker Prize, and was a fiction finalist for the National Book Critics Circle Award. Moshfegh's subsequent novels include My Year of Rest and Relaxation, Death in Her Hands, and Lapvona.

Early life and education

Moshfegh was born in Boston, Massachusetts, in 1981. Her mother was born in Croatia and her father, who is Jewish, was born in Iran. Her parents were both musicians and taught at the New England Conservatory of Music. As a child, Moshfegh learned to play piano and clarinet.

She attended the Commonwealth School in Boston and received her BA in English from Barnard College in 2002. She completed an MFA in Literary Arts from Brown University in 2011. During her MFA study at Brown, she taught undergraduates, notably, Antonia Angress (author of the 2022 novel Sirens & Muses). Moshfegh was a Wallace Stegner Fellow in fiction at Stanford University from 2013-2015.

Career 
After college, Moshfegh moved to China, where she taught English and worked in a punk bar.

In her mid-twenties, Moshfegh moved to New York City. She worked for Overlook Press, and then as an assistant for Jean Stein. After contracting cat-scratch fever, she left the city and earned an MFA from Brown University. During those years, she supported herself by selling vintage clothing which she has described as mostly "tea dresses."

Works 
In 2014, Fence Books published Moshfegh's novella McGlue. McGlue was the first recipient of the Fence Modern Prize in Prose.

In August 2015, Penguin Press published Moshfegh's novel Eileen. It received positive reviews. The book was shortlisted for the 2016 Man Booker Prize. In the book, Eileen, the protagonist and narrator, describes a series of events that occurred years ago, when she was young and living in a Massachusetts town that she calls "X-ville." At the beginning of the novel, she is working as a secretary at a local juvenile prison while living with and caring for her abusive father, a retired police officer with alcoholism and paranoia. As the story continues, we learn more about a dramatic situation that causes her to leave her life in X-ville.

Homesick for Another World, a collection of short stories, was published in January 2017.

On July 10, 2018, Penguin Press published Moshfegh's second novel, My Year of Rest and Relaxation. The book describes a young art history graduate living in New York City over 15 months from mid-June 2000. Recently graduated from college and ambivalently mourning the recent deaths of her parents, she quits her job as a gallerist and undertakes to sleep for a year with the assistance of sleeping pills and other medications prescribed by a disreputable psychiatrist.

Also in 2018, Moshfegh wrote a piece for Granta in which she describes an experience she had with a much older male writer when she was 17 years old.

Moshfegh is a frequent contributor to the Paris Review and has published six stories in the journal since 2012.

In August 2020, Vintage published Moshfegh's third novel, Death in Her Hands. Moshfegh has called the book "a loneliness story."

In June 2022, Penguin Press published Moshfegh's fourth novel, Lapvona, which follows Marek, the abused son of the town shepherd, along with other characters from the fictional, medieval fiefdom of Lapvona.

Moshfegh and her husband, Luke Goebel, were awarded a shared "written by" credit (with Elizabeth Sanders) for their work on the A24 film Causeway. The film premiered at the Toronto International Film Festival in September 2022.

Personal life
Moshfegh is married to the writer Luke B. Goebel, whom she met during an interview. They live in Pasadena, California.

Awards and honors

 2013–15 Wallace Stegner Fellowship at Stanford University
 2013 Plimpton Prize for Fiction from The Paris Review for her story "Bettering Myself"
 2014 Fence Modern Prize in Prose (judged by Rivka Galchen), inaugural winner for McGlue
 2014 Believer Book Award winner for McGlue
 2016 MacDowell Colony Fellowship
 2016 Hemingway Foundation/PEN Award for Eileen
 2016 Man Booker Prize (shortlist) for Eileen
 2018 The Story Prize finalist for Homesick for Another World

Bibliography

Novels
Eileen (2015)
My Year of Rest and Relaxation (2018)
Death in Her Hands (2020)
Lapvona (2022)

Short fiction 
Collections
Homesick for Another World (2017)
Stories

"Medicine", Vice, December 1, 2007
"Disgust" (alternately titled "Mr Wu"), The Paris Review, No. 202, Fall 2012
"Bettering Myself", The Paris Review, No. 204 Spring 2013
"Malibu", Vice, July 3, 2013
"The Weirdos", The Paris Review, No. 206, Fall 2013
"A Dark and Winding Road", The Paris Review, No. 207, Winter 2013
"No Place for Good People", The Paris Review, No. 209, Summer 2014 
"Slumming", The Paris Review, No. 211, Winter 2014
"Nothing Ever Happens Here", Granta, Issue 131, Spring 2015
"The Surrogate", Vice, June 5, 2015
"Dancing in the Moonlight", The Paris Review, No. 214 Fall 2015
"The Beach Boy", The New Yorker, January 4, 2016
 "The Locked Room", The Baffler, Spring 2016
 "An Honest Woman", The New Yorker, October 24, 2016
"Love Stories", Vice, December 5, 2016
"Brom", Granta, Issue 139, 2017
"The Pornographers", Vice, March 26, 2017
"I Was a Public Schooler", The Paris Review, No. 233, Summer 2020
"The Imitations", Apartamento, No. 27, May 17, 2021

Essays
"Anything to Make You Happy", Lucky Peach, May 2015
"How to Shit", The Masters Review, October 2015
"Coyotes, the Ultimate American Tricksters", The New Yorker, July 2016

Critical studies and reviews of Moshfegh's work
Homesick for another world
 
———————
Notes

References

External links

 
Believer interview
Hazlitt interview
Gawker interview

Living people
American women novelists
21st-century American novelists
Writers from Boston
American people of Croatian descent
21st-century American women writers
21st-century American short story writers
1981 births
American people of Iranian-Jewish descent
Novelists from Massachusetts
Jewish American short story writers
Jewish American novelists
American writers of Iranian descent
Stegner Fellows
Barnard College alumni
Brown University alumni
21st-century American Jews